As the Valley of Death Becomes Us, Our Silver Memories Fade is the third studio album by American post-metal band A Storm of Light. The  album in its entirety is available for streaming on Profound Lore Records' Bandcamp site.

Track listing

References 

2011 albums
A Storm of Light albums